Saraelen Leandro Ferreira Lima (born ) is a Brazilian indoor volleyball player. She is a current member of the Brazil women's national volleyball team.

Career
She competed at the 2015 FIVB U23 World Championship, 2016 Montreux Volley Masters, 2017 FIVB Volleyball Women's World Grand Champions Cup, and 2017 FIVB Volleyball Women's Club World Championship.

Clubs 
  EC Pinheiros (2010–2014)
  São Caetano (2014–2015)
  Nestlé Osasco (2015–2017)
  Hinode Barueri (2017–2018)
  Vôlei Bauru (2018–2019)
  EC Pinheiros (2019–)

References

External links
 FIVB Biography

1994 births
Living people
Brazilian women's volleyball players
Place of birth missing (living people)
Middle blockers
Sportspeople from Goiânia